Malama Katulwende is a Zambian author and thinker, born in the Luapula province of this Southern African country. A teacher by profession and educated in Catholic Seminaries and at the University of Zambia (UNZA), he first appeared on the literary scene with poems published in an anthology titled Under the African Skies: Poetry form Zambia in 2001.

In 2005, his novel Bitterness was published in the United States and launched him internationally as a young, promising African writer. For this novel, he was awarded the 2006 Julius Chongo Best Creative Writer in Zambia at the Ngoma Awards Ceremony held in Lusaka. The book has been used by Emory University in Atlanta, Georgia, among others, for its courses in anthropology.

In 2011, Katulwende published  a philosophical collection of essays, The Fire At The Core: Discourses on Aesthetics, Music, Jurisprudence, Ethno-Politics and Good Governance, in which he tackled recurring themes of Zambia's underdevelopment and political decadence. The treatises "Why Should We Obey the Law" and “The Clouds” in this collection of essays placed him as one of the most profound and interesting thinkers to have emerged from Africa, worthy of study.

In 2018, his collection of poetry titled Drums of War was released, which establishes him as a poet with great command of the African imagery.

His work at Knowledgegates, an Information Technology company he co-founded in 2006, led him to co-write and publish, in 2014, the book Teach Yourself Computers: A Practical Guide to Microsoft Word, Excel, PowerPoint, Publisher and Internet Applications.

Katulwende is the owner of the Thorn Bird Literary Agency in Lusaka and editor at the Zambian magazine The Zambian Teacher.

Publications

Books:
 Under the African Skies: Poetry form Zambia, Zambia Women Writers Association (2001), 142 p.
 Bitterness (novel), New York: Mondial (2005), 288 p.
 The Fire At The Core: Discourses on Aesthetics, Music, Jurisprudence, Ethno-Politics and Good Governance (essays), New York: Mondial (2011), 218 p.
 (with James Kapesa) Teach Yourself Computers: A Practical Guide to Microsoft Word, Excel, PowerPoint, Publisher and Internet Applications, Lusaka: Mafinga Publishers Limited (2014), 376 p.
 Drums of War (poetry), AuthorHouseUK (2018), 92 p.

Other Texts (Selection):
 Re-evaluating Mwanawasa's legacy, 3rd Edition. In: Zambian Economist, 13 October 2008
 The Lumpa Massacre. In: Zambian Economist, 27 March 2010
 A dogged abuse of copyright rules.... In: Zambian Economist, 29 August 2010
 Foreword to: This Time, Tomorrow. A Compendium of Laboured Voices from the Zambian Komboni – an anthology of poems composed by the late Mwange Kauseni, edited by Malama Katulwende
 Zambia’s Kalindula Music: Death, Drums, And Poetry. In: The Culture Trip, 20 October 2016
 Classroom Questions and Their Formulation. In: The Zambian Teacher, 29 January 2018
 Schemes of Work. In: The Zambian Teacher, 8 July 2018
 Teaching As An Art and As A Science. In: The Zambian Teacher, 8 July 2018
 How To Create A Lesson Plan. In: The Zambian Teacher, 26 October 2018

The Novel Bitterness

For this novel published in 2005 in New York, the author received the Julius Chongo Award 2006 for Best Creative Writing at the Ngoma Awards Ceremony.

"Tribal and social affiliations and the student riots at the University of Zambia, in a captivating and intelligent story about love, political involvement and individual responsibilities. This is one of the most realistic and passionate contemporary novels about the life of young people in today's Africa, written by Malama Katulwende, a Zambian poet and intellectual. It describes the seeming incompatibility of old African traditions and modern life, depicts the political struggle of Zambia's students, and the hope and despair of the book's main character, his family, lover, and friends. Based on real events, this novel provides an insight into African history, daily life, and culture, at the example of an oppressive society. Imagine Europe's revolts of 1968 in Austral Africa..." (From the back cover).

"Malama Katulwende’s Bitterness was published in 2005 by Mondial in New York. It is a Bildungsroman, it is not only a boy’s growth from childhood to adulthood but also his psychological growth from ignorance to an open minded awareness of himself. In order for this transformation to take place, the protagonist Besa must defy all odds and defy his family’s wishes. His journey takes him from his home village in Samfya to the University of Zambia,
back to his village and finally Lusaka. – The novel mixes fact and fiction. Although the characters are fictional, the settings are real places which a reader may recognise when reading. The University of Zambia for example is a factual place. One may further realise that the timing of the novel in terms of duration is realistic. For example the time Besa spends at the university is believable. Further, the plot is believable because it fits into the real world’s dimension and even gives the impression that such a story has happened before in the real world. While this technique of blending fact and fiction helps to make the story believable, it raises complexity in that one can no longer differentiate fact from fiction." (Mwaka Siluonde, cf. note 20)

"Published by Mondial in New York, the 281-page novel resonates with the anger of Ngũgĩ wa Thiong'o, the pessimism of Ayi Kwei Armah and the lyricism of Chinua Achebe, but in his own voice, Katulwende explains why the centre can no longer hold in a land where a beggar who stretches out his hand for a cob of maize is beaten to death by an angry, blood thirsty mob, and where youth is powerless against the inscrutability of a future which runs like a river with no end... In his view, things are falling apart because the shrine is no more. The gods of his forefathers are dead and his people have befriended those who have always stood against them, imitating their ways and worshipping their gods. At this point, Katulwende's anger slowly crystallizes into an Africanist ideology." (Excerpt from Edem Djokotoe's book review A Taste Of Bittersweet Bile. In: The Post (Zambia) - February 24, 2006)

Texts about Malama Katulwende
 
 Malama Katulwende: A Zambian Literary Voice (Culture Trip, 11 October 2016)
 Kelvin Kachingwe: Mwange Kauseni's anthology of poems published. In: Zambia Daily Mail Limited, 1 February 2017

References

External links
 Malama Katulwende's Facebook Page
 Bitterness page on the website of Mondial (Katulwende's publisher in New York, NY)
 Page of The Fire at the Core on the website of Mondial (Katulwende's publisher in New York, NY)

Zambian novelists
21st-century Zambian writers
Zambian non-fiction writers
Zambian poets
1967 births
Living people